Engelbert Zaschka (September 1, 1895 in Freiburg im Breisgau, Germany – June 26, 1955 in Freiburg im Breisgau, Germany) was a German chief engineer, chief designer and inventor. Zaschka is one of the first German helicopter pioneers and he is a pioneer of flying with muscle power and the folding car. Zaschka devoted himself primarily to aviation and automotive topics, but his work was not limited to them.

Engelbert Zaschka is a prominent representative of the rotary aircraft, a class of rotorcraft systems - according to Zaschka. In 1928/1929 Zaschka developed and constructed the first collapsible and foldable small car (folding car) and in 1934 an early muscle-powered airplane.

Biography

Engelbert Zaschka came from a family of musicians, his father Wenzel taught zither and played in the Freiburg City Orchestra, his mother Emilie, née Rombach, was a singer; he was the second oldest of four children. He grew up in the Scheffelstraße and in the Bürgerwehrstraße, where his father had the tenement house no. 11 built in art nouveau style in 1910. At the age of 14 he applied for his first patent, founded a "hobby flying club" in Freiburg-Wiehre and allegedly made his first flying attempts at the Freiburg Schlossberg. After attending the "Höhere Bürgerschule" in Freiburg, he went to Altenburg to study engineering. Afterwards he worked as an engineer at Rheinmetall in Düsseldorf and went to Berlin in 1916. There he worked as chief designer at Orion Aktiengesellschaft für Motorfahrzeuge. In the 1930s and 1940s Zaschka was employed by the aircraft manufacturer Henschel. In Berlin, he was registered in 1926 in the Neukölln district of Lichtenrader Straße 59, in 1929 in Selchower Straße 15/16 near Tempelhofer Flugfeld, in 1934 in Flughafenstraße 21 and in 1943 in Weserstraße 34a. After the Second World War, he settled again in Freiburg im Breisgau, where he operated a workshop (vehicle factory. family bicycles or Zaschka vehicle factory) at Türkenlouisstraße 47. Zaschka died on 26 June 1955 in his hometown Freiburg im Breisgau.

Zaschka became one of the first German helicopter pioneers. His machine is a striking representative of the Rotationsflugzeug (Zaschka calls it "rotating airplane"). Chief Engineer Engelbert Zaschka pursued in 1929 in Berlin, the approach of the folding-Zaschka three-wheeler. This city car concept was aimed to be cost effective and space saving by the vehicle could be folded after use sparingly. In 1934 Engelbert Zaschka completed a large human-powered aircraft. He was an inventor who held numerous international patents as it related to the helicopter.

Engineering Activities

Zaschka Helicopter 

In 1927 Engelbert Zaschka of Berlin built a helicopter, equipped with two rotors, in which a gyroscope was used to increase stability and serves as an energy accumulator for a gliding flight to make a landing. Gliding in this case means a straight descent. He wanted to develop an efficient propeller drive. A swivelling propeller at the rear provided propulsion and rudder control. The machine was a combination of an autogyro and a helicopter. The principal advantage of the machine, Zaschka says, is in its ability to remain motionless in the air for any length of time and to descend in a vertical line, so that a landing may be accomplished on the flat roof of a large house. In appearance, the helicopter does not differ much from the ordinary monoplane, but the carrying wings revolve around the body.

Zaschka Human-Power Aircraft (1934) 

In 1934 Engelbert Zaschka completed a large human-powered aircraft, the Zaschka Human-Power Aircraft. Zaschka constructed the large human-powered tractor monoplane with a narrow wing spanning about 66 feet (20 metres). On 11 July 1934 he flew his large human-powered aircraft, the Zaschka Human-Power Aircraft, about 20 meters at Berlin's Tempelhof Airport without assisted take off.

Motorcycle: The German Orionette (1921-1925) 

From 1921 till 1925 the design department of Orionette AG für Motorfahrzeuge in Berlin (Berlin SO 26, Oranienstr. 6), headed by Engelbert Zaschka, also produced some interesting unorthodox designs. Orionette is a historic German motorcycle brand.

Folding Zaschka Three-wheeler (1929) 

The space and parking problems of the metropolitan areas were recognized in the 1920s. In 1929 Engelbert Zaschka invented a three-wheeled car in Berlin. Zaschka's car was a folding three-wheeler, designed so that it could be taken apart within 20 minutes. The car could be "knocked down" into three main sections. It was capable of a speed of 25 to 30 miles an hour. Aspects of Zaschka's car were important to U.S. inventor and architect Richard Buckminster Fuller in the development of his Dymaxion car in 1933.

Reception

Composer 
As a composer, Engelbert Zaschka created popular music, including Slavoma - Der neuste Tanz (1925), which was recorded at least twice: by the orchestra Bernard Etté and the saxophone orchestra Dobbri under the direction of Otto Dobrindt. Furthermore, he wrote and composed the hit Wer hat denn bloß den Hering am Schlips mir festgemacht (1928).

Patents

Publication 

 Zaschka, Engelbert. Drehflügelflugzeuge. Trag- und Hubschrauber. Berlin-Charlottenburg: C.J.E. Volckmann Nachf. E. Wette. 1936. ASIN B001PE5XZ2.
One of the first publications about helicopters. It is written in 1936 for airplane designers, as well as supporters of the rotary-wing aircraft construction.

Gallery

Bibliography 

 Fay, John Foster. The Helicopter: History, Piloting and How It Flies. David & Charles PLC. 1976.
 Reay, David Anthony. The history of man-powered flight. Oxford/New York: Pergamon Press. 1977.
 Nowarra, Heinz J. German Helicopters 1928-1945. Schiffer Publishing. 1991.
 Besser, Rolf. Technik und Geschichte der Hubschrauber: Von Leonardo da Vinci bis zur Gegenwart. Bonn: Bernard & Graefe Verlag.  1996.
 Grosser, Morton. Gossamer Odyssey: The Triumph of Human-powered Flight. Zenith Press. 2004.

TV documentary in which Zaschka is treated 
Große Ideen – kleine Flops: Geistesblitze von A bis Z. Documentary, Germany, 2016, 90 minutes, authors: Andreas Kölmel and Jürgen Vogt; Production: SWR Fernsehen, German premiere: May 16, 2016; Information about the documentary.

See also 

 List of rotorcraft
 Human-powered aircraft
 Three-wheeled car

References

External links 

Smithsonian National Air and Space Museum Washington:  Zaschka

Articles
“Says His Helicopter Can Halt in Flight; Midair Transfer of Passengers Predicted“, The New York Times, June 4, 1927.
Air Flivvers, The Washington Post, June 6, 1927.
 Aeroplane that rises vertically, The Argus (Australia), October 27, 1928.
 

Pictures
The Zaschka Human-Power Aircraft and Engelbert Zaschka (Berlin, 1934)

1895 births
1955 deaths
Engineers from Freiburg im Breisgau
German aerospace engineers
20th-century German inventors
Cyclecars
Businesspeople from Berlin